Merrittstown is an unincorporated community in Warren County, in the U.S. state of Ohio.

History
The community was named after Abram and Caleb Merritt, proprietors of a local tile factory.

References

Unincorporated communities in Warren County, Ohio